The Oke-Ogun Polytechnic, Saki is a state government higher education institution located in Shaki, Oyo State, Nigeria. The current acting Rector is Dr. Yekeen Adegoke Fasasi.

History 
The Oke-Ogun Polytechnic, Saki was established in 2001.

Courses 
The institution offers the following courses;

Accounting
 Transport Planning and Management
 Agricultural and Bio-Environmental Engineering/Technology
 Public Administration
 Statistics
 Banking and Finance
 Transport Planning and Management
 Civil Engineering
 Estate Management And Valuation
 Mechanical Engineering Technology
 Agricultural Engineering/Technology
 Building Technology
 Civil Engineering Technology
 Public Administration
 Science Laboratory Technology
 Urban and Regional Planning
 Animal Health And Production Technology
 Insurance
 Horticultural Technology
 Computer Science
 Agricultural Technology
 Local Government Studies
 Business Administration and Management
 Food Technology
 Quantity Surveying
 Production Tech
 Surveying and Geo-Informatics
 Insurance

Convocation 
The Combined Maiden Convocation Ceremony of the Oke-Ogun Polytechnic, Saki will hold on Saturday, 24 September, The Acting Registrar of the Institution, Ojo Babatunde Lanre, on Thursday, 8 September 2022, stated “the Convocation Ceremony is for Students who graduated in 2015/2016, 2016/2017, 2017/2018, 2018/2019, and 2019/2020 Academic Sessions.” 2022

Principal Officers 
Chairman, Governing Council
Barrister Lateef Sarafadeen Abiola (ONIJO)

Acting Rector
Dr. Yekeen A. Fasasi 

Acting Registrar
Mr. Babatunde L. Ojo FNIM, JP

Acting Bursar 
Mr Malik A. Abdulazeez FCNA, ACTI, ACCrFA, ACE

Acting Librarian
Mr. Olugbenga Adeniyi

References 

Universities and colleges in Nigeria
2001 establishments in Nigeria